is the rapid transit network in the city of Yokohama, Japan, south of Tokyo in Kanagawa Prefecture. It is operated by Yokohama City Transportation Bureau as two lines, though three continuous lines exist.

Lines

The Yokohama Municipal Subway consists of three lines: Line 1, Line 3 and 4.
Line 1 and 3 are operated as a single line, nicknamed the Blue Line.
Line 4 is nicknamed the Green Line. Upon the addition to the network of this line on March 30, 2008, the Blue Line and Green Line monikers came into official use.

Transfer between the Blue and Green Line is possible at Center-Kita and Center-Minami Stations. Feeder bus services from western Kawasaki City area run to Azamino Station.

The "missing" Line 2 was planned to run from Kanagawa-Shinmachi Station via Yokohama Station to Byobugaura Station. The   line was previously considered as a bypass line for easing congestion on the Keikyū Main Line, however, the line deemed unnecessary after the Keikyu Line increased its capacity.

Blue Line
The Blue Line is Japan's second-longest subway line, after the  Toei Ōedo Line in Tokyo.

In July 2011, a "mobile phone power off area" was set up in each car, and the use of mobile phones is officially banned except in other areas.

Green Line
The Green Line (Line 4) opened on March 30, 2008, between Hiyoshi Station and Nakayama Station, operating distance  (total extension distance ). It takes approximately 21 minutes from Hiyoshi station to Nakayama station.

Planned extensions

Blue Line
On 21 January 2020, Yokohama City and Kawasaki City announced the route and four new stations for the planned 6.5 km extension of the Blue Line from Azamino Station to Shin-Yurigaoka Station on the Odakyū Odawara Line. Construction of this section is expected to complete by 2030. In June 2020, the Transportation Bureau started environmental impact asssesment procedures of the extension project.

Green Line
The Green Line was built as part of a larger master plan to construct a circular line in Yokohama. The full line will be a C-shaped line that stretches from Tsurumi Station via Hiyoshi Station, Nakayama Station, Futamatagawa Station, Higashi-Totsuka Station, Kamiōoka Station, and Negishi Station to Motomachi-Chūkagai Station.

Station numbering 
Numerical designations for the stations on the Blue Line were introduced in 2002, coinciding with Yokohama city hosting the finals of the 2002 FIFA World Cup and the subway's 30th anniversary, starting from Shonandai station (1) to Azamino station (32). With 32 stations on the line and 32 teams in the World Cup, each station was themed after a country. Alphabetical designations were added when the Green Line opened. The Blue Line stations are B01 through B32, while Green Line stations starts from Nakayama Station (G01) to Hiyoshi Station (G10). At two stations—Center-Minami Station and Center-Kita Station—where both lines overlap, a different station number is attached to each route.

Network Map

See also
 List of metro systems
 Minatomirai Line, a private subway line in Yokohama
 Transport in Greater Tokyo

Notes

External links
 Transportation Bureau, City of Yokohama – official website 
 Network map
 Yokohama Municipal Subway Map 

 
Transport in Yokohama